Pierrino Mascarino (September 22, 1939 – June 2, 2017) was an Italian actor perhaps best known for his lead performance in the film Uncle Nino.

Mascarino was also known for such films and television series as Tears of the Sun, Nip/Tuck, Everybody Loves Raymond and Aaron's Way.

Filmography

References

External links

Italian male film actors
Italian male television actors
Place of birth missing
2017 deaths
1939 births